Michigan City Generating Station is a coal and natural gas-fired power plant located on the shore of Lake Michigan in Michigan City, Indiana. It is operated by Northern Indiana Public Service Company (NIPSCO), owned by NiSource. 

The station was built on the location of a large sand dune, the Hoosier Slide, which had been removed by mining for glassmaking sand.

Future
NIPSCO announced plans in 2018 to continue to operate the Michigan City Generating Station in the short term but to allow it to run down, pending final shutdown in approximately 2028.  The demolition of the station would free up approximately 1 mile of Lake Michigan lakefront space.

Misconception
The use of a hyperboloid cooling tower at the station has been mistaken as evidence for a nuclear power plant at this location when in fact there are no nuclear power plants in the state of Indiana.  A nuclear power plant was proposed for the Bailly Generating Station approximately 17 km to the south-southwest but was canceled in 1981.

See also

 List of power stations in Indiana

References

External links

Coal-fired power stations in Indiana
Natural gas-fired power stations in Indiana
Michigan City, Indiana
Buildings and structures in LaPorte County, Indiana
Energy infrastructure completed in 1950
Energy infrastructure completed in 1951
Energy infrastructure completed in 1974